Chad Billins (born May 26, 1989) is an American professional ice hockey defenseman currently under contract with HV71 of the Swedish Hockey League (SHL). An undrafted player, Billins played four seasons of college hockey with the Ferris State Bulldogs that culminated in his serving as co-captain of the team that reached the first Frozen Four appearance in school history in 2012.  He turned professional in 2012 with the Grand Rapids Griffins of the American Hockey League (AHL) and was a member of their Calder Cup championship team. Billins made his NHL debut in 2013 as a member of the Calgary Flames.

Playing career
Billins played two seasons of junior hockey, first in the North American Hockey League (NAHL) with the Alpena IceDiggers in 2006–07, then the Waterloo Black Hawks of the United States Hockey League (USHL). He then moved to the college ranks, joining the Ferris State Bulldogs of the Central Collegiate Hockey Association (CCHA). Billins played four seasons with Ferris State, culminating with his senior year in 2011–12 when he co-captained the Bulldogs to the first appearance in the Frozen Four in school history.

An undrafted player, Billins turned professional in 2012 and signed an American Hockey League (AHL) contract with the Grand Rapids Griffins for the 2012–13 season. He appeared in 76 games with the Griffins, and his 10 goals were three more than the highest single-season total he reached with Ferris State. He was selected to play for the Western Conference AHL All-Star Team at the 2013 AHL All-Star Game. He appeared in an additional 24 playoff games as the Griffins won the Calder Cup championship.

His play with the Griffins earned Billins an NHL contract with the Calgary Flames as the team signed him to a two-way deal. He was assigned to Calgary's AHL affiliate, the Abbotsford Heat to start the season.  Billins was leading the Heat with five goals when he earned his first NHL recall on November 1, 2013. He made his NHL debut on November 5, and scored his first point by assisting on a Jiří Hudler goal in a 5–1 loss to the Minnesota Wild.

On June 30, 2014, it was announced that Billins had signed a contract with Russian club, CSKA Moscow for the following 2014–15 season. Despite his signing he was tendered a qualifying offer by the Flames to retain his NHL rights. Billins played in just 21 games with CSKA for 6 points before opting to move to the Swedish Hockey League for the remainder of the season with Luleå HF on December 20, 2014.

Billins joined his third club in under a year, in signing a two-year contract with fellow SHL club, Linköpings HC on June 12, 2015.

As a free agent on July 1, 2016, Billins returned to the NHL, in securing a one-year, two-way contract with the Vancouver Canucks. In the 2016–17 season, Billins was assigned to AHL affiliate, the Utica Comets for the duration of the campaign. Unable to make a return to the NHL, Billins appeared in 72 games compiling 3 goals and 20 points.

As an impending free agent, Billins opted to resume his European career, returning to former club, Linköpings HC of the SHL, on a two-year contract on April 19, 2017.

At the conclusion of his contract in Sweden, Billins continued his European career in Germany, agreeing to a two-year deal with reigning Champions, Adler Mannheim of the DEL, on May 3, 2019.

After one season with Adler Mannheim, Billins opted to end his contract and return to Sweden in agreeing to a one-year deal with Brynäs IF of the SHL on December 22, 2020.

Career statistics

Regular season and playoffs

International

Awards and honors

References

External links 

1989 births
Living people
Abbotsford Heat players
Adler Mannheim players
American men's ice hockey defensemen
Brynäs IF players
Calgary Flames players
HC CSKA Moscow players
Ferris State Bulldogs men's ice hockey players
Grand Rapids Griffins players
HV71 players
Linköping HC players
Luleå HF players
Ice hockey players from Michigan
People from Marysville, Michigan
Olympic ice hockey players of the United States
Ice hockey players at the 2018 Winter Olympics
Sportspeople from Metro Detroit
Undrafted National Hockey League players
Utica Comets players
Waterloo Black Hawks players
AHCA Division I men's ice hockey All-Americans